Santo Domingo de los Colorados or simply known as Santo Domingo, is the biggest canton in the Santo Domingo de los Tsáchilas Province, after La Concordia officially became part of the province on May 31, 2013. The canton is named after its seat, the town of Santo Domingo. The canton partially occupies the Toachi river basin. The Toachi river flows into the Daule river.

Demographics
Ethnic groups as of the Ecuadorian census of 2010:
Mestizo  81.0%
Afro-Ecuadorian  7.7%
White  6.8%
Montubio  2.5%
Indigenous  1.7%
Other  0.3%

Political divisions

Santo Domingo Canton is divided into 7 urban parishes and 7 rural parishes.

 Urban parishes: Santo Domingo, Chiguilpe, Río Verde, Bombolí, Zaracay, Abraham Calazacón, Río Toachi
 Rural parishes: San José de Alluriquín, El Esfuerzo, Luz de América, Puerto Limón, San Jacinto del Búa, Santa María del Toachi, Valle Hermoso

References

Cantons of Ecuador
1967 establishments in Ecuador

qu:Santo Domingo de los Colorados kiti